Grobiņa Municipality is a former municipality in Courland, Latvia. The municipality was formed in 2009 by merging Bārta Parish, Gavieze Parish, Grobiņa Parish, Medze Parish and the town of Grobiņa with the administrative centre being Grobiņa. The population in 2020 was 8,347.

Grobiņa Municipality ceased to exist on 1 July 2021, when it was merged into the newly-formed South Kurzeme Municipality.

Notable countrymen 
  (Georg Sigismund von Bilterling, 1733-1803) — pastor and teacher
  (1895-1955) — politician
  (1889-1947) — actor
 Andrejs Freimanis (1914-1994) — soldier
  (1882-1951) — admiral
 Eduard Schmidt von der Launitz ( Eduard Schmidt von der Launitz , 1796-1869) — German sculptor
  (1882-1941) — politician
 Fricis Rokpelnis (1909-1969) — writer

See also 
 Administrative divisions of Latvia (2009)

References 

 
Former municipalities of Latvia